JK Retro is an Estonian football club based in Tallinn. Founded in 2009 as Eesti Koondis, they currently play in the III Liiga, the fifth tier of Estonian football.

Players

Current squad
 ''As of 25 July 2017.

Statistics

League and Cup

References

Football clubs in Estonia
Association football clubs established in 2009